Code page 1169 is an 8-bit character encoding, designed to cover several Asian languages that use the Cyrillic script which are not covered by the older Windows-1251 (which this code page is based on): Azerbaijani (in Russia; outside of Russia switched to Latin), Bashkir, Kazakh, Kyrgyz, Mongolian, Tajik, Tatar, and Uzbek. It also covers the Russian language.

Character set
The following table shows Code page 1169. Only the bottom half is shown, the top is identical to Windows 1252. Each character is shown with its Unicode equivalent and its hexadecimal code.

References

Windows code pages